Jodl is a surname. It may refer to:

 Alfred Jodl (1890–1946), a German general during World War II
 Ferdinand Jodl (1896–1956), a German general during World War II
 Friedrich Jodl (1849–1914), a German philosopher and psychologist
 Margarethe Jodl (1859–1937), German writer, co-founder of the Viennese Women's Club
 Stefanie Jodl (born 1998), a German singer

See also 
 Jodel
 Yodeling

German-language surnames